Whittemore is a surname shared by several notable people, among them being:

 Alice S. Whittemore, American epidemiologist and biostatistician
 Arthur Whittemore (1896–1969), Justice of the Massachusetts Supreme Judicial Court
 Benjamin Franklin Whittemore (1824–1894), American Civil War chaplain and politician 
 Edward Whittemore (1933–1995), American author 
 Harvey Whittemore (born 1956), American lawyer and businessman 
 James D. Whittemore (born 1962), American judge
 Jo Whittemore (born 1977), American author 
 John Whittemore (1899–2005), American track and field athlete
 Liz Wilde (born Anne Whittemore in 1971), American radio personality
 Reed Whittemore (1919-2012), American poet
 Rodney Whittemore, American politician
 Samuel Whittemore (1694–1793), American farmer and oldest known colonial combatant in the American Revolutionary War
 Thomas Whittemore (1871–1950), American archaeologist
 Thomas Whittemore (Universalist) (1800–1861), American Universalist and politician
 William J. Whittemore (1860–1955), American painter

See also
Whitmore (surname)

English-language surnames
English toponymic surnames